Willie and the Wheel is an album from American country music artists Willie Nelson and Asleep at the Wheel. This album was released on February 3, 2009, on the Bismeaux Records label and was nominated for the Grammy Award for Best Americana Album.

Track list
"Hesitation Blues" - 2:47
"Sweet Jennie Lee" (Walter Donaldson)  - 3:01
"Fan It" (Frankie Jaxson, Dan Howell) - 2:46
"I Ain't Gonna Give Nobody None o' This Jelly Roll" (Spencer Williams, Clarence Williams) - 3:11
"Oh! You Pretty Woman" - 2:50
"Bring it on Down to My House" - 3:29
"Right or Wrong" (Arthur Sizemore, Haven Gillespie, Paul Biese) - 3:10
"Corrine Corrina" - 3:17
"I'm Sittin' on Top of the World" - 4:45
"Shame on You" (Spade Cooley) - 2:59
"South" (Bennie Moten, Thamon Hayes) - 3:39
(with Paul Shaffer and Vince Gill)
"Won't You Ride in My Little Red Wagon" (Rex Griffin) - 3:39
"I'll Have Somebody Else" (Bob Wills) - 3:31

Tracks 1, 5, 6, 8 & 9 are credited as traditional songs, arranged for this recording by Ray Benson.
Track 13 appears on the deluxe version of the album which also includes unique postcards for each track.

Chart performance

Personnel
 Dave Alexander – Trumpet
 William Armstrong – Assistant Engineer
Ray Benson – Acoustic & Electric Guitar, Arranger, Vocals, Producer, Liner Notes, Art Direction, Mixing
 Don Cobb – Mastering
 Eric Conn – Mastering
 Sarah Dodds – Design
 Shauna Dodds – Design
 Floyd Domino – Piano
 Jonathan Doyle – Clarinet
 Mindy Espy Reyes – Product Manager
 Vince Gill – Electric Guitar
 Boo Macleod – Engineer
 Elizabeth McQueen – Vocals
 M.J. Mendell – Assistant Producer
 David Earl Miller – Bass
 Michael Mordecai – Trombone
 Willie Nelson – Vocals
 Adam Odor – Engineer, Mixing
 Lisa Pollard – Photography
 Vance Powell – Engineer
 Dick Reeves – Art Direction, Design
 Eddie Rivers – Steel Guitar
 Jason Roberts – Fiddle, Mandolin, Vocals
 David Sanger – Drums
 Peter Schwarz – Associate Producer
 Sam Seifert – Acoustic Guitar, Engineer, Mixing
 Paul Shaffer – Piano
 Dan Skarbek – Assistant Producer
 Kevin C. Smith – Bass
 Jerry Wexler – Executive Producer
 John Michael Whitby – Piano
 John "Sly" Wilson – Design

External links
 Willie and the Wheel's Official Website
 Willie Nelson's Official Website
 Asleep at the Wheel's Official Website

2009 albums
Willie Nelson albums
Asleep at the Wheel albums
Collaborative albums